The Distar UFM-13 Lambada (named for the Brazilian dance) is a Czech shoulder-wing, two-seat motor glider originally designed and produced by Urban Air and now built by Distar Air of Ústí nad Orlicí.

Design and development
The design is on the Federal Aviation Administration's list of approved special light-sport aircraft.

The aircraft features a cantilever wing, a T-tail, a two-seat side-by-side enclosed cockpit under a bubble canopy, fixed tricycle or conventional landing gear with a steerable tail wheel and a single engine in tractor configuration.

The aircraft is made from composites. Flaperon settings are 0°, 5°, 9° and 16°, with the last setting assisted by the spoilers. The main landing gear legs are fabricated from fibreglass laminates and the wheels are equipped with single lever hydraulic brakes. Standard engines available are the  Rotax 912UL and the  Jabiru 2200 four-stroke powerplants.

The aircraft achieves a 26:1 glide ratio with 13 m wings and 30:1 with 15 m wings fitted. Aside from its use as a motorglider, the Lambada has also been successfully employed as a glider tug.

Specifications (UFM-13 Lambada)

See also

References

External links

Official website

2000s Czech sailplanes
Distar Air aircraft
Motor gliders
Shoulder-wing aircraft
Single-engined tractor aircraft
T-tail aircraft